A State Scholarship was a financial scholarship award for British university entrants based on Scholarship Level exam results. Although the award was based on exam performance, the amount received was means-tested. Most university entrants were funded however by grants from their local education authority. Whilst State Scholarships from the Central Government were greatly sought after for their prestige value they had the same value as local authority grants.
In the 1950s, when the pass mark for A-level examinations and the more demanding S-level examinations was 40%, the target over three A-levels and two S-levels was about 325/500 for a State Scholarship.  Candidates at and above this level were seen by their schools as likely to be competitive also in the Scholarship examinations for university entrance to Oxford and Cambridge.

History
Founded in 1920, they were replaced after the 1962 awards by student grants.

References

Scholarships in the United Kingdom